"Little Miracles (Happen Every Day)" is a song by American recording artist Luther Vandross. The single supports his 1993 platinum album, Never Let Me Go. The song became a top ten hit on Billboard's Hot R&B Singles and reached top 30 on the UK Singles Chart. It also became the most successful single from the album on the US Billboard Hot 100, peaking at number sixty-two. It was nominated for best R&B songwriting at the 36th Grammy Awards in March 1994.

Critical reception
Larry Flick from Billboard described "Little Miracles (Happen Every Day)" as "a warm and familiar ballad fueled by his instantly recognizable voice and positive lyrics." He noted that it has "a grand, necessarily dramatic tone, with an arrangement overflowing with sweeping strings and a gospel-like choir of backing singers that includes Cissy Houston and Lisa Fischer." Randy Clark from Cashbox called it a "rich, mid-tempo blending of R&B with a large helping of Gospel". 

A reviewer from People Magazine deemed it a "umpteenth ode to the power of love", adding that "bolstered by carefully layered and artfully displayed background vocals, the single is quietly triumphant." Leesa Daniels from Smash Hits rated it five out of five. She wrote, "This man has the best voice in the world, all hot chocolate and melted marshmallows. He makes you feel as though everything will be all right. This starts slowly but come the chorus you'll be screeching at the top of your lungs trying to hit the notes with the great man. It's like all his other records, but when they're this good, who cares?"

Track list
 US CD single
"Little Miracles (Happen Every Day)" - 4:10
"I'm Gonna Start Today - 6:10

 UK CD single 
"Little Miracles (Happen Every Day)" - 4:10
"I'm Gonna Start Today" - 6:10
"Heart of a Hero" - 3:10

Charts

References

External links
 www.luthervandross.com

1993 singles
1993 songs
Luther Vandross songs
Epic Records singles
Songs written by Marcus Miller
Songs written by Luther Vandross